1st Division (United Kingdom) may refer to:
 1st (United Kingdom) Division: active division of the British Army, which was originally formed in 1809. Previously known as the 1st Division, No.1 Division, 1st Infantry Division, and 1st Armoured Division (1978–2014).
 1st Armoured Division: known as the Mobile Division between 1937 and 1939. Disbanded in 1945. In 1946, a new formation was created when the 6th Armoured Division was renamed. That formation was disbanded in 1947.
 1st Cavalry Division (United Kingdom): Previously known as the Cavalry Division and fought during the Napoleonic Wars, the Crimean War, the Second Boer War. During the Second World War, a new formation was raised, and subsequently became the 10th Armoured Division.